Tūrgār, also Thurgar (Sogdian: twrγ'r, Chinese: 咄曷 Duō-hé) was a medieval Sogdian ruler (an Ikhshid) in Transoxiana and successor to his father Ghurak during the period of the Muslim conquest of Transoxiana. He was the last ruler of Samarkand and its surroundings from ca. 738 until no later than 755/57, until the Arabs took full control of the region. He was an Ikhshid, a princely title of the Iranian rulers of Soghdia and the Ferghana Valley in Transoxiana during the pre-Islamic and early Islamic periods.

Turgar issued coinage with his own name in the legend. He was the last of the Ikhshid rulers to issue coinage. Many of his coins were found in the excavations of Penjikent.

Turgar was a successor of Gurak, who ruled in the period following the famous king Divashtich. Turgar's rule seems to have enjoyed a relative period of prosperity, under the rather benevolent supervision of the Muslim Umayyad Governor Nasr ibn Sayyar. This continued until the revolt of Abu Muslim and the establishment of the Abbasid dynasty, after which Sogdians had to convert to Islam.

References

Sources 
 
 
 
 
 
 
 
 
 
 

Sogdian rulers
8th-century rulers in Asia
8th-century Iranian people
Zoroastrian rulers
People from Samarkand
Muslim conquest of Transoxiana